Morris Kenneth Mott (born May 25, 1946) is a Canadian former professional ice hockey player who played 199 games in the National Hockey League. He played with the Winnipeg Jets of the World Hockey Association and the California Golden Seals of the NHL. He joined the Canadian national team in 1965, playing with the team until it was dissolved in 1970. After completing his hockey career Mott earned a PhD, and taught sports history at Brandon University.

He is the brother of Darwin Mott, who played one game in the WHA; the two played together for Västra Frölunda IF in Sweden in 1975-76.

Academic career
Besides a BA and an MA degree from the University of Manitoba, he also obtained a PhD degree in Sports history from Queen's University at Kingston in 1982. Mott is a professor emeritus of the department of History at Brandon University in Brandon, Manitoba.

Career statistics

Regular season and playoffs

International

References

External links

 Research profile

1946 births
California Golden Seals players
Canadian ice hockey right wingers
Frölunda HC players
Ice hockey people from Saskatchewan
Ice hockey players at the 1968 Winter Olympics
Living people
Manitoba Bisons ice hockey players
Medalists at the 1968 Winter Olympics
Olympic ice hockey players of Canada
Olympic bronze medalists for Canada
Olympic medalists in ice hockey
Winnipeg Jets (WHA) players
Canadian expatriate ice hockey players in Sweden